is a virtual pachinko video game for the Nintendo 64. It was released only in Japan in 1997.

See also
Heiwa Corporation

References

Nintendo 64 games
Nintendo 64-only games
Pachinko video games
1997 video games
Japan-exclusive video games
Shouei games
Video games developed in Japan